State Route 274 is a state highway completely within Parowan in the southwestern portion of the US state of Utah that connects SR-143 with I-15. The entirety of the highway is routed along Main Street.

Route description
The route proceeds north along a two-lane undivided highway from the intersection of Center Street (SR-143) and Main Street in the middle of Parowan in Iron County. The road exits the center of Parowan and passes the Parowan Airport before terminating at a diamond interchange at exit 78 on I-15.

History
With the construction of I-15 around Parowan imminent, SR-1 was moved from old US-91 to the proposed bypass in 1968. SR-143, which had ended at SR-1 (Main Street) in Parowan, was extended north on Main Street and a planned connection to I-15 at exit 78. However, plans had changed by the time I-15 was completed in 1975, and a second interchange (exit 75) served the west side of Parowan. SR-143 was instead rerouted south and west to meet I-15 there, and what had become part of SR-143 in 1968 was instead redesignated SR-274.

Major intersections

References

274
Utah State Route 274
 274
Streets in Utah